Gao Song is the name of:

Gao Song (figure skater) (born 1981), Chinese male figure skater
Gao Song (basketball) (born 1992), Chinese women's basketball player
Gao Song (professor) (born 1964), President of South China University of Technology